The Philippine Chamber of Commerce and Industry (acronymed as either PCI or PCCI) is a non-government association of private businesses that works to influence government actions on issues such as Agriculture, Information Technology, Human Resources, and Tourism.

History
The Chamber of Commerce of the Philippines started on July 19, 1903, as the Philippine Chamber of Commerce (PCI).

In 1948, Hilarion Henares, Sr. established the Small Industries and Machine Shop Owners of the Philippines (abbreviated as SIMSOP) and after two years of establishment, the Chamber of Commerce of the Philippines changed its name to Philippine Chamber of Commerce on March 4, 1950. 

On July 1, 1978, PCCI was officially formed and registered with the Securities and Exchange Commission after the merging of Chamber of Commerce of the Philippines (CCP) and Philippine Chamber of Commerce (PCI).

References

External links
PCCI Official Website

Chambers of commerce
Trade associations based in the Philippines
1978 establishments in the Philippines
Organizations established in 1978
Chambers of commerce in the Philippines